John Edward Biby Jr. (February 23, 1912 – March 23, 2002), was an American sailor who competed in the 1932 Summer Olympics.

In 1932 he was a crew member of the Angelita which won the gold medal in the 8-metre class.

John Biby Jr was a member of Alamitos Bay Yacht Club in Long Beach.

References
 John Biby: An Oral History

External links
 
 
 

1912 births
2002 deaths
American male sailors (sport)
Sailors at the 1932 Summer Olympics – 8 Metre
Olympic gold medalists for the United States in sailing
Medalists at the 1932 Summer Olympics